Alberto Rafael Garrido García (3 September 1949 – 4 December 2007) was an Argentine–Venezuelan journalist, political analyst and writer known for his works on Hugo Chávez. The focus of a better part of his career, his extensive knowledge on Chávez led Venezuelan media to dub him a "Chavólogo".

Early life and education
Garrido was born in Buenos Aires in 1949. As a youth, he became politically active in leftist groups fighting against the military dictatorship that ruled the country from 1976 to 1983. His activism led to him fleeing Argentina and settling in Venezuela, where he finished high school at the Liceo Libertador in Mérida. He later returned to Argentina to study philosophy at the National University of Misiones and social psychology at the Universidad Argentina John F. Kennedy, before going back to Venezuela, where he completed a doctoral degree on agrarian development at the University of the Andes. He would later teach courses on Political Science at the University of the Andes.

Due to his Argentine heritage, he was known by Venezuelan coworkers, friends and peers as "Che Garrido".

Career
Garrido's career in Venezuelan media led to him being appointed director of the local newspapers El Globo (Caracas) and El Correo de los Andes (Mérida). He was also an editorial advisor and political editor at Reporte and member of the directive board of Relevo magazine, and served as the Argentina correspondent of El Diario de Caracas during the Trial of the Juntas. He would later become a regular columnist at El Universal.

His first published book, Guerrilla y conspiración militar en Venezuela (1999) featured extensive interviews with leftist guerrilla fighters Douglas Bravo, William Izarra and Francisco Prada in the context of the election of Hugo Chávez as president of Venezuela. Over the course of his career, he released up to 17 books on Chávez and the Bolivarian Revolution, becoming one of the most published specialists on the Chávez phenomenon and leading Venezuelan media to dub him "Chavólogo". His views and positions were variously described as either pro-Chávez and anti-Chávez by supporters and detractors of the late president; Chávez himself considered Garrido's writing to be "unbiased".

In 2002, he published El otro Chávez, a controversial book compiling interviews with Herma Marksman, who was Chávez's mistress.

He died on 4 December 2007 in Caracas due to complications caused by pancreatic cancer, and was survived by a son and a daughter. His last interview, taken the day before his death by Jurate Rosales, was published in Revista Zeta on 7 December 2007.

Works

On Hugo Chávez and the Bolivarian Revolution

 (self-published)
 (interviews with Norberto Ceresole; self-published)

 (interviews with Herma Marksman, self-published)
 (self-published)
 (self-published)
 (self-published)
 (self-published)
 (self-published)
 (self-published)

 (self-published)

Other works

References

External links
Garrido interviewed by Marcel Granier in Primer Plano (RCTV), 2003

1949 births
2007 deaths
Argentine journalists
Argentine political scientists
Venezuelan journalists
Venezuelan political scientists
Argentine expatriates in Venezuela
People from Mérida, Mérida
Journalists from Buenos Aires
Naturalized citizens of Venezuela
National University of Misiones alumni
University of the Andes (Venezuela) alumni
Academic staff of the University of the Andes (Venezuela)
Deaths from cancer in Venezuela
20th-century political scientists